is a railway station in the city of  Kiyosu, Aichi Prefecture, Japan, operated by the Tōkai Transport Service Company (TKJ).

Lines

Station layout
The station has two elevated opposed side platforms with the station building underneath. The station building has automated ticket machines, TOICA automated turnstiles and is unattended.

Platforms

Adjacent stations

|-
!colspan=5|Tōkai Transport Service Company

Station history
Owari-Hoshinomiya Station was opened on December 1, 1991.

Passenger statistics
In fiscal 2016, the station was used by an average of 205 passengers daily.

Surrounding area
Kaigarayama Shell Midden

See also
 List of Railway Stations in Japan

References

External links

Railway stations in Japan opened in 1991
Railway stations in Aichi Prefecture
Kiyosu, Aichi